Ali Keykhosravi (born January 13, 1999) is an Iranian football goalkeeper who currently plays for Iranian club Sepahan in the Persian Gulf Pro League.

Club career
Keykhosravi spent his youth career at Sepahan and joined the first team in July 2017. He made his debut on 11 August 2017 against Pars Jonoubi Jam, coming on as a second-half substitute and immediately saving a penalty kick. The match finished 1–1.

Last Update:27 August 2019

References

1999 births
Living people
Association football goalkeepers
Iranian footballers
Sepahan S.C. footballers